Álvaro Ricaldi Alcócer (born April 28, 1982 in Cochabamba) is a Bolivian retired football defender.

International career
Ricaldi made four appearances for the Bolivia national team in 2003, scoring one goal in a friendly match against Panama on August 31, 2003.

International goals
Scores and results list Bolivia's goal tally first.

References

External links

1982 births
Living people
Sportspeople from Cochabamba
Bolivian footballers
Bolivia international footballers
C.D. Jorge Wilstermann players
The Strongest players
Club Aurora players
Club San José players
Club Real Potosí players
La Paz F.C. players
Association football defenders